Alfredo Gonzalez may refer to:

Alfredo González Flores (1877–1962), president of Costa Rica 1914–1917
Alfredo Cantu Gonzalez (1946–1968), US Marine Corps sergeant, posthumous Medal of Honor
Alfredo Razon Gonzalez (born 1978), Filipino footballer
Alfredo González Tahuilán (born 1980), Mexican footballer
Alfredo González (baseball) (born 1992), Venezuelan baseball catcher
Alfredo González (sport shooter) (born 1944), Colombian Olympic sports shooter

See also
Luis Alfredo Palacio González (born 1939), known as Alfredo Palacio, president of Ecuador 2005–2007